Hajra Khan may refer to one of the following

Hajra Khan (footballer), Pakistani footballer
Hajra Khan (actress), Pakistani actress